John William Godward (9 August 1861 – 13 December 1922) was an English painter from the end of the Neo-Classicist era. He was a protégé of Sir Lawrence Alma-Tadema, but his style of painting fell out of favour with the rise of modern art.

Early life
Godward was born in 1861 and lived in Wilton Grove, Wimbledon. He was born to Sarah Eboral and John Godward (an investment clerk at the Law Life Assurance Society, London). He was the eldest of five children. He was named after his father John and grandfather William. He was christened at St Mary's Church, Battersea on 17 October 1861. The overbearing attitude of his parents made him reclusive and shy later in adulthood.

Career

He exhibited at the Royal Academy from 1887. When he moved to Italy with one of his models in 1912, his family broke off all contact with him and even cut his image from family pictures.  Godward returned to England in 1921, died in 1922, and is buried in Brompton Cemetery, West London.

One of his best-known paintings is Dolce far Niente (1904), which was purchased for the collection of Andrew Lloyd Webber in 1995. As in the case of several other paintings, Godward painted more than one version; in this case, an earlier (and less well-known) 1897 version with a further 1906 version.

He committed suicide at the age of 61 and is said to have written in his suicide note that "the world is not big enough for [both] myself and a Picasso".

His estranged family, who had disapproved of his becoming an artist, were ashamed of his suicide and burned his papers. Only one photograph of Godward is known to survive.

Works
Godward was a Victorian Neo-Classicist, and therefore, in theory, a follower of Frederic Leighton. However, he is more closely allied stylistically to Sir Lawrence Alma-Tadema, with whom he shared a penchant for the rendering of Classical architecture – in particular, static landscape features constructed from marble.

The vast majority of Godward's extant images feature women in Classical dress posed against landscape features, although there are some semi-nude and fully nude figures included in his oeuvre, a notable example being In The Tepidarium (1913), a title shared with a controversial Alma-Tadema painting of the same subject that resides in the Lady Lever Art Gallery. The titles reflect Godward's source of inspiration: Classical civilization, most notably that of Ancient Rome (again, a subject binding Godward closely to Alma-Tadema artistically).

Given that Classical scholarship was more widespread among the potential audience for his paintings during his lifetime than in the present day, meticulous research of detail was important in order to attain a standing as an artist in this genre. Alma-Tadema was an archaeologist as well as a painter, who attended historical sites and collected artifacts he later used in his paintings: Godward, too, studied such details as architecture and dress, in order to ensure that his works bore the stamp of authenticity.

In addition, Godward painstakingly and meticulously rendered other important features in his paintings, animal skins (the paintings Noon Day Rest (1910) and A Cool Retreat (1910) contains examples of such rendition) and wildflowers (Nerissa (1906) and Summer Flowers (1903) are again examples of this).

The appearance of beautiful women in studied poses in so many of Godward's canvases causes many newcomers to his works to categorize him mistakenly as being Pre-Raphaelite, particularly as his palette is often a vibrantly colourful one. The choice of subject matter (ancient civilization versus, for example, Arthurian legend) is more properly that of the Victorian Neo-classicist. In common with numerous painters contemporary with him, Godward was a 'High Victorian Dreamer', producing images of an idealized and romanticized world that, in the case of both Godward and Alma-Tadema, came to be criticized as a world-view of 'Victorians in togas'.

Godward "quickly established a reputation for his paintings of young women in a classical setting and his ability to convey with sensitivity and technical mastery the feel of contrasting textures, flesh, marble, fur and fabrics." Godward's penchant for creating works of art set in the classical period probably came from the time period in which he was born. "The last full-scale classical revival in western painting bloomed in England in the 1860s and flowered there for the next three decades."

Gallery

List of works by the artist

c. 1880–1881
Portrait of Mary Perkington Godward
c. 1882–1883
Portrait of Mary Frederica Godward
c.1883
Country House in the 18th Century
c.1887
Expectation
Poppaea
Portrait of Harriet (Hetty) Pettigrew in Classical Dress
Portrait of Lillian (Lilly) Pettigrew in Classical Dress
A Yellow Turban
c. 1887-1888
Japonica
A Roman Head
1888
A Beauty in Profile
An Eastern Beauty
The Engagement Ring
Flo
Ianthe
Lily
Threissa
The Tiff
Waiting for the Dance
1889
Callirhoe
Grecian Reverie
A Greek Girl
Head of a Roman Woman 
Ianthe
His Birthday Gift
Waiting For An Answer
1890
A Pompeian Bath
Athenais
Flowers Of Venus
1891
A Pompeian Lady
Innocent Amusement
The Sweet Siesta of a Summer Day
1892
At The Garden Shrine, Pompeii
Classical Beauty
Far Away Thoughts (landscape format)
Far Away Thoughts (portrait format)
Leaning On The Balcony
The Betrothed
The Playground
With Violets Wreathed And Robe Of Saffron Hue
1893
A Priestess (nude)
Reflections
Yes Or No
At the Fountain
1894
A Priestess
1895
Mischief and Repose
The Muse Erato At Her Lyre
Tigerskin (date uncertain)
1896
Campaspe (nude)
He Loves Me, He Loves Me Not
Female Portrait
1897
Dolce Far Niente (first version)
Venus Binding Her Hair, by 1897 (nude)
1898
At The Gate Of The Temple
Idle thoughts
On The Balcony (first version)
The Ring
1899
The Bouquet
The Delphic Oracle
The Mirror
The Signal
1900
Idleness
The Jewel Casket
The Toilet
1901
At The Garden Door
Chloris
Girl In Yellow Drapery
Idle Hours
Sweet Dreams
The Favourite
The Seamstress
Venus At The Bath (nude)
Youth And Time

1902
An Italian Girl's Head
Ionian Dancing Girl
When the Heart is Young
1903
Amaryllis
Summer Flowers
The Old, Old Story
The Rendezvous
1904
The Melody (or A Melody)
Dolce Far Niente (second version)
In The Days Of Sappho
1905
A Greek Beauty
A Roman Matron
Flabellifera
Mischief
1906
Dolce Far Niente (third version)
Drusilla
Nerissa
The Tambourine Girl (first version - girl facing the viewer)
The Tambourine Girl (second version - girl reclining against wall)
1907
The Love Letter
1908
A Classical Lady
A Grecian Girl
Ismenia
1909
A Classical Beauty
A Grecian Lovely (date uncertain)
At The Thermae (semi nude)
Tympanistria
1910
A Cool Retreat
Noon Day Rest
Reverie (first version)
Sappho
1911
In Realms Of Fancy
On The Balcony (second version)
1912
A Tryst
Absence Makes The Heart Grow Fonder
An Offering To Venus
By The Wayside
Reverie (second version)
Sabinella
The Peacock Fan
1913
Golden Hours
In The Tepidarium (nude)
La Pensierosa
Le Billet Doux
The Belvedere
1914
The Necklace
The New Perfume
Tranquility
1915
In The Prime Of The Summer Time
1916
Ancient Pastimes
By The Blue Ionian Sea
Lesbia With Her Sparrow
1917
A Lily Pond
The Fruit Vendor
Under The Blossom That Hangs On The Bough
1918
A Fond farewell
Sweet Sounds
1920
A Red, Red Rose
1921
Megilla
1922
Contemplation
Nu Sur La Plage (an exception to all other works, this is a 'modern' nude)
Date unknown
Grape Vines
Ophelia
Time To Play

This list is not a complete list but serves to illustrate the extent of Godward's output.

References

External links

Godward's Women and Kittens
Biography of J W Godward by Vern Grosvenor Swanson

Godward at the Getty Museum
 Works of JW Godward at http://www.the-athenaeum.org

19th-century English painters
English male painters
20th-century English painters
1861 births
1922 deaths
Burials at Brompton Cemetery
People of the Victorian era
Painters who committed suicide
Neo-Pompeian painters
1922 suicides
20th-century English male artists
19th-century English male artists
Suicides in Fulham